Paul Gillon (11 May 1926 – 21 May 2011) was a French comics artist. He won the 1982 Grand Prix de la ville d'Angoulême.

Born in Paris, he considered fashion, theater and cinema, and only by accident made a career as a comics author. In the magazine Vaillant, he continued the older series Lynx Blanc, and created Fils de Chine and Cormoran. From 1959 until 1972, he drew  for France Soir and also did series for the Journal de Mickey.

Together with Jean-Claude Forest, he created the science fiction cosmic opera series Les naufragés du temps (Lost in Time) and in L'Écho des savanes (Echo of the Savannahs) he produced the erotic comics La Survivante (The Survivor) and Jéhanne. He died in Amiens.

Works

Lynx Blanc (White Lynx), in the collection Grandes Aventures Vaillant, 1961 (first published between 1948 and 1957)
 #11: Tonnerre sur les Îles (Thunder on the Islands)
 #15: Aventures dans la Brousse (Adventures in the Bushland)
Jérémie (published in Pif gadget between 1968 and 1972)
Les dieux barbares (The Savage Gods), Lombard, 1973; Les Humanoïdes Associés, 1981  
La mijaurée, la mégère et le nabot (The Prim Miss, the Shrew and the Runt), Lombard, 1974; Les Humanoïdes Associés, 1982
Intrigues à la Jamaïque (Intrigue in Jamaica), Les Humanoïdes Associés, 1979  
Le fort de San-Juan (The Fort of San Juan), Les Humanoïdes Associés, 1980

 Les naufragés du temps (Lost in Time, first four volumes with Jean-Claude Forest) Les Humanoïdes Associés
L'étoile endormie (The Sleeping Star) - 1974 - 
La mort sinueuse (Sinuous Death) - 1975 - 
Labyrinthes (Labyrinths) - 1976 - 
L'univers cannibale (The Cannibal Universe) - 1976 - 
Tendre chimère (Sweet Dream) - 1977 - 
Les maîtres-rêveurs (The Dream Masters) - 1978 - 
Le sceau de Beselek (The Saw of Beselek) - 1979 - 
Ortho-Mentas - 1981 - 
Terra - 1984 - 
Le cryptomère (The Cryptomeria) - 1989 - 

 Histoire du socialisme en France (History of Socialism in France), Service de l'Homme, 1977 (introduction by François Mitterrand   )
 With Roger Lecureux: Fils de Chine (Son of China), Glénat, 1978 (first published between 1950 and 1953)
 Wango, Furioso (Futuropolis Diffusion), 1980 (first published between 1958 and 1960)
Volume 1: 1980
Volume 2: 1982
Téva, Les Humanïdes Associés, 1982 (based on a TV series from 1973)
Les Léviathans
Les Léviathans (The Leviathans), Les Humanoïdes Associés, 1982; retitled Le Plan Aspic, Les Humanoïdes Associés, 1990  
La dent de l'alligator (Alligator's Tooth), Les Humanoïdes Associés, 1990; Albin Michel, 2000  
Réaction en chaîne (Chain Reaction), Albin Michel, 2000

 Les Mécanoïdes Associés (The Society of Mechanoids), Humanoïdes Associés, coll. Pied Jaloux, 1982
 Capitaine Cormoran (Paul Gillon - complete works part 1), Humanoïdes Associés, 1983 (first published between 1954 and 1959)
 Moby-Dick, Hachette, 1983 (with Jean Ollivier)
 Processus de Survie (Process of Survival), Humanoïdes Associés, coll. Pied Jaloux, 1984
 Notre-Dame de Paris, Hachette, 1985 (with Claude Gendrot)
 La survivante (The Survivor)
 La survivante - October 1985
 L’héritier (The Heir) - October 1987
 La revanche (Revenge) - April 1990
 L’ultimatum (Ultimatum) - November 1991

With Patrick Cothias, Au nom de tous les miens (For Those I Loved), based on Martin Gray
Les fourmis (The Ants), Glénat, 1986
Les renards (The Foxes), Glénat, 1987

 Jehanne (Joan of Arc), Albin Michel
 La sève et le sang (Sap and Blood), 1993
 La pucelle (The Maiden), 1997

With Denis Lapière, La dernière des salles obscures (The Last of the Dark Halls), Dupuis
 Part 1: 1996
 Part 2: 1998
 Le contrat (The Contract), Albin Michel, 2001.
 La veuve blanche (White Widow), coll. Aire Libre, Dupuis, 2002.
With Frank Giroud, Le Décalogue, part 7: La conspiration (The Conspiracy), 2002.
With Richard Malka, L'Ordre de Cicéron ("Cicero's Order")
Le procès (The Trial), Glénat, 2004
Mis en examen (Cross-examination), Glénat, 2006

With Frank Giroud, Quintet
Deuxième mouvement - Histoire d'Alban Méric (Second Movement: the Story of Alban Méric), coll. Empreinte(s), Dupuis, 2005

Awards
 1972: Prix Phénix for Jérémie
 1974: Prix Phénix for Les Naufragés du temps
 1978: Best French Artist at the Angoulême International Comics Festival, France
 1982: Grand Prix de la ville d'Angoulême
 1986: Grand Prix RTL for Au nom de tous les miens
 1986: Special Jury Award at the 17th Lucca Festival
 1998: Grand Prix  at the Lucca Festival

Sources
 1978: Schtroumfanzine - Les Cahiers de la bande dessinée, no. 36 - Dossier Gillon
 1986: Champagne ! no. 2/3, October - Interview Gillon
 1982: b.d. bulle (magazine of the Angoulême Festival), no. 10 - Dossier Gillon
 1998 : Monsieur Gillon, biography by Claude Gendrot, published together with La dernière des salles obscures

Video
 Paul Gillon, by Jean-Loup Martin, Cendrane Films / 8 Mont Blanc productions, 1997 (25' 30")

External links
 Biography
 Biography on the site of publisher Dupuis

French illustrators
French comics artists
French comics writers
1926 births
2011 deaths
Grand Prix de la ville d'Angoulême winners
French male writers